Aristotelia brizella is a moth of the family Gelechiidae. It is found in most of Europe, except Ireland, Switzerland and most of the Balkan Peninsula. Outside of Europe, it is found in North Africa and the Near East.

The wingspan is 10–12 mm. Adults are on wing from May to June and again from July to August in two generations per year.

The larvae feed on the seedheads of thrift (Armeria maritima) and sometimes common sea-lavender (Limonium vulgare).

References

Aristotelia (moth)
Moths described in 1833
Moths of Africa
Moths of Asia
Moths of Europe
Taxa named by Georg Friedrich Treitschke